"Texas Fight" is the official fight song of the University of Texas at Austin and was written by Colonel Walter S. Hunnicutt in collaboration with James E. King, then director of the Marlin High School Band.

It is sung to a fast tempo version Taps, a song played at many military funerals. "Texas Fight" is played following touchdowns and extra points at University of Texas (UT) football games, other Longhorn sports events, as well as on other occasions of celebration. The repeated strain contains portions of "The Eyes of Texas," the school's alma mater.

History and usage
Hunnicutt wrote "Texas Fight" in response to the song used by their longtime rivals, Texas A&M University. One of the Aggie songs then was Farmers Fight, which consisted of the words "Farmers Fight" sung to Taps, a song played at many military funerals. Impressed by the song, Hunnicutt figured he would write "Texas Fight" also sung to Taps, but making the song more march-like and having "Texas" throughout instead of "Farmers." In a letter written in 1952 by Colonel Hunnicutt, he says "I wrote 'Texas Fight'... in an attempt to counteract the songs and yells of the Texas Aggies, which were not too complimentary to our Student Body and some of which tended to ridicule 'The Eyes of Texas'."

The words of the song as finally adopted were written by "Blondie" Pharr, director of the Longhorn Band from 1917 to 1937. "Texas Fight" is played following touchdowns and extra points at University of Texas (UT) football games, other Longhorn sports events, as well as on other occasions of celebration.

The repeated strain contains portions of "The Eyes of Texas," the school's alma mater. This modification was made in the summer of 1967 at the suggestion of Charles "Buster" Griffith, a member of the trumpet section, and was premiered - unannounced - at the first football game that fall, after which it became tradition.

Lyrics 
The wording of the song is as follows.

Alternate Lyrics
"Hail, Hail, the gang's all here" is rarely, if ever, sung. It is almost always replaced with "Give 'em hell, give 'em hell! Go, Horns, go!"
Another version often used at football games, particularly by students, is "Give 'em hell, give 'em hell! Make 'em eat shit!"., which was intended originally as a jab at the Arkansas Razorbacks.
Another version used at the annual Texas-OU game is "Give 'em hell, give 'em hell! OU sucks!" In a commercial for ESPN's College GameDay, Kirk Herbstreit improvised "Yeah, we're Texas, just north of Mexico. Home of the armadillo, black gold and El Arroyo..." before Longhorns coach Mack Brown says, "we don't freestyle 'Texas Fight', Big Boy."

References

External links
"Texas Fight" performed by the Texas Longhorn Band

American college songs
College fight songs in the United States
Big 12 Conference fight songs
Texas Longhorns
Songs about Texas
Year of song missing